Werner Herbert (born 29 August 1963) is an Austrian politician who is currently a Member of the Federal Council for the Freedom Party of Austria (FPÖ).

References

1963 births
Living people
Members of the Federal Council (Austria)
Members of the National Council (Austria)
Freedom Party of Austria politicians